In Māori tradition, Aotearoa was one of the great ocean-voyaging canoes that were used in the migrations that settled New Zealand. Aotearoa was captained by Mokotōrea or Mokoterea. It landed at Aotea on the Tasman Sea coast of the Waikato and was buried there.

See also
List of Māori waka
Māori migration canoes

References

Māori waka
Māori mythology